Max Oliver Goldblatt (born January 29, 1983, in Los Angeles) is an American actor, writer and director. He graduated from Wesleyan University in 2005. He is the son of American Cinema Editor Mark Goldblatt. He briefly worked in a renaissance faire as a blacksmith.

Filmmaker
Max is writer, editor and director of 2005's critically acclaimed short film Kinetoscope, a twisted horror fantasy.

Kinetoscope was an Official Selection at: Santa Barbara International Film Festival, Cinequest (San Jose), New Haven Film Festival, Boston Underground Film Festival, Winnipeg International Film Festival, Reel Jews Film Festival (New York), Rooftop Film Festival (Brooklyn), Film Independent's Spirit Awards/Los Angeles Film Festival's Cinema Lounge and the Northampton Independent Film Festival.

Actor
Max Goldblatt is noted for his role of Phillip Grubenov in the 1995 film Heavyweights, about the adventures of teenagers attending an American 'fat camp.'

He had a side role in 1998's My Giant.

Filmography

Film
 Heavyweights (1995) - Phillip Grubenov
 Bushwhacked (1995) - Barnhill
 Sticks and Stones (1996) - Book
 My Giant (1998) - Jerry
 3000 Miles to Graceland (2001) - Impersonator No. 2
 Egg (2005, Short) - Bird Child No. 1
 Jettison Your Loved Ones (2005, Short) - Sam
 Death to the Tinman (2007, Short) - Narrator

Television
 The Good Life (1994) - Billy

References

External links 

1983 births
Living people
Wesleyan University alumni